The Christian Congregation in Brazil was founded in Brazil by the Italian-American missionary Luigi Francescon (1866–1964), as part of the larger Christian Congregation movement.

History

Louis Francescon came for the first time to Brazil from Chicago, Illinois in 1910. After arriving in São Paulo, Francescon went to Santo Antonio da Plantina, Paraná. His eleven missionary trips were quite successful among fellow Italian immigrants and Brazilian nationals. 

The Christian Congregation of Brazil is one of the most dynamic and it is fast-growing. In 2016, the Christian Congregation in the Brazil had around 2.8 million members in 2020 and 24,272 temples (2021) in that country and more than 50,000 temples in all world and an intense missionary work abroad. In the metro area of São Paulo, the church shows its strength: there are 500,000 followers, distributed in 2,000 churches and a mother-church in the Brás district that houses a 9,800 member congregation in the Brás district. 
 
Francescon was among the early founders of the Italian-American Pentecostal church in Chicago. He had left the First Italian Presbyterian Church of Chicago because of his belief in Water Baptism by immersion. Later, he accepted the doctrines of anointing with oil, miracles, and Holy Spirit baptism at the North Avenue Full Gospel Mission led by William Howard Durham. Evangelists from Chicago went to the Italian colonies in the United States planting churches mostly in the Northeast. Most of those churches were incorporated into the Christian Church of North America, with a few affiliated with the Christian Congregation in the United States.

Theology

The beliefs of the Christian Congregation is summarized by Articles of Faith. The church believes in the Holy Trinity, the Bible, in divine interventions and miracles. Salvation is considered by faith in Jesus Christ.

The 12 Articles of Faith also called "Points of Doctrine and Faith that were once given to the Saints" declares:
 We believe and accept the entire Bible as the infallible Word of God, inspired by the Holy Spirit; it is the only and perfect order of our faith and manner of living; to which nothing can be added or taken away, which is the power of God unto salvation to every believer. (2 Pet 1:21; 2 Tim 3:16-17; Rom 1:16).

 We believe there is only one living and true God, eternal, with infinite power, Creator of all things; and in the unity of Him there are three distinct Persons: The Father, the Son, and the Holy Spirit.(Eph 4:6; Matt 28:19; 1 John 5:7).

 We believe that Jesus Christ, the Son of God is the Word made flesh, who assumed the human nature through the Virgin Mary and so, is true God and true man, having two natures in one Person, the divine and human; and therefore is the only Saviour, who suffered death for the guilt of all men. (John 1:14; Luke 1:27-35; 1 Peter 3:18).

 We believe in the personal existence of the devil and his angels, evil spirits that together with him will be punished in the everlasting fire. (Matt 25:41). 

 We believe that regeneration, or the new birth is received only through faith in Christ Jesus, who was delivered up for our offenses and was raised for our justification. They who are in Christ Jesus (cleansed through His blood) are new creatures and have Him for Wisdom, Righteousness, Sanctification, and Redemption.(Rom 3:24-25; 2 Cor 5:17; 1 Cor 1:30).

 We believe in water baptism, performed in the Name of Jesus Christ (Acts 2:37), with single immersion,  in the name of the Father, and of the Son, and of the Holy Ghost, according to Christ's commission. (Matt 28:18-19).

 We believe in the baptism in the Holy Spirit, with the sign of speaking in tongues as the Spirit gives utterance. (Acts 2:4; 10:45-47; 19:6).

 We believe in commemorating the Lord's Supper. The Lord Jesus the same night in which he was betrayed took bread: and when he had given thanks, he brake it, and said, Take eat: this is my body, which is broken for you: this do in remembrance of me. After the same manner also he took the cup, when he had supped, saying, This cup is the new testament in my blood: this do ye as often as ye drink it, in remembrance of me. (Luke 22:19-20; 1 Cor 11:24)  

 We believe it is necessary to abstain from things offered to idols, and from blood, and from things strangled, and from fornication, as decreed by the Holy Spirit in the general assembly held at Jerusalem.(Acts 15:28-29; 16:4; 21:25).

 We believe that Jesus Christ, Himself, bore all our sickness, and for that reason we obey the following commandment: "Is any sick among you? Let him call for the elders of the church; and let them pray over him, anointing him with oil in the name of the Lord; and the prayer of faith shall save the sick, and the Lord shall raise him up; and if he has committed sins, they shall be forgiven him."(Matthew 8:17; James 5:14-15).

 We believe that the Lord, Himself, (before the millennium) "Shall descend from heaven with a shout, with the voice of the archangel, and with the trump of God; and the dead in Christ shall rise first; then we which are alive and remain shall be caught up together with them in the clouds, to meet the Lord in the air; and so shall we ever be with the Lord." (1 Thess 4:16-17; Rev 20:6).

 We believe there shall be a bodily resurrection of all dead, just and unjust, "And these shall go away into everlasting punishment, but the righteous into life eternal." (Acts 24:15; Matt 25:46),

The church and services
Congregational worship is held at churches, and they hold two important services apart from the normal weekday services - Baptism, which is done once in a person's lifetime, and the Holy Supper, which is held at church once a year (or more, for those who missed the official day). Singing of hymns are accompanied by an orchestra. During worship, men and women sit on opposite sides in the church. Man and women often dress in modest attires, with the women wearing veils, dresses, or skirts, and the men often dress in suits. The inscription "In the Name of the Lord Jesus" is written above the pulpit. Services are usually ministered by a cooperator, a deacon, or an elder from the ministry. Usually, in larger churches, there can also be a baptismal fount behind the pulpit for the occasional baptism services. Men are encouraged to not wear shorts, or a t-shirt and have a beard however this is not mandatory. The Christian has its doctrine fully based on the bible. The doctrine of Christian Congregation is supposed to help its members reach the ultimate goal. Eternal life in heaven.

References

ALVES, Leonardo M. "Christian Congregation in North America: Its Inception, Doctrine, and Worship". Dallas, 2006. 
FRANCESCON, Louis. "Faithful Testimony". Chicago, 1952.
HOLLENWEGGER, Walter. "The Pentecostals".Minneapolis, 1972.

External links
Official website of the Christian Congregation of the /WORLD
Official website of the Christian Congregation of the /BRAZIL
Official website of the Christian Congregation /USA
Official website of the Christian Congregation /AUS 
Official website of the Christian Congregation /UK
Official website of the Christian Congregation of the Uruguay /UY

Christian Congregation (Pentecostal)
Christian organizations established in 1910
1910 establishments in Brazil
Pentecostal denominations in South America
Pentecostal churches in Brazil